Ares is the Greek god of war and violence, equivalent of the Roman god Mars.

Ares or ARES may also refer to:

Technology
 Ares (rocket), various proposed and existing launch vehicles and missiles
 Aerial Reconfigurable Embedded System, a DARPA concept for a robotic VTOL vehicle
 Aerial Regional-scale Environmental Survey, a robotic spacecraft proposed to fly in the Martian atmosphere
 Atmospheric Reentry Experimental Spaceplane, a French spaceplane concept from 2009
 Augmented Reality Sandtable, an interactive digital sand table used by the U.S. military for soldier training 
 Scaled Composites ARES, a demonstrator aircraft built by the company Scaled Composites
 Advanced Rail Energy Storage, a new energy storage system utilizing gravitational potential energy
 ares, a multi-system emulator forked from higan
 Ares, an Armoured Personnel Carrier variant of the General Dynamics Ajax being developed for the British Army
 ARES, a component of Proteus Design Suite
 Amateur Radio Emergency Service, a corps of volunteer emergency radio operators

Arts and entertainment

Film
 Ares (film), a 2016 French dystopian film
 Ares, a film project developed by American director Robert Zemeckis

Literature

Fantasy fiction
 Ares (comic book), a 2006 Marvel Comics comic book series
 Ares (DC Comics), the Greek god as he appears in DC Comics
 Ares (manhwa), a Korean comic about a group of mercenaries
 Ares (Marvel Comics), the Greek god as he appears in Marvel Comics
 Ares, a bat in The Underland Chronicles

Science fiction
 Ares (magazine), a science fiction wargame magazine.
 Ares, a large interplanetary spacecraft in the novel Red Mars in the Mars trilogy series
 Ares, a NASA spaceflight program in the 2011 novel The Martian and the film adaptation

Music
 Ares (album), an album by Salt the Wound
 Ares, a 2008 song from Intimacy by Bloc Party
 "Ares", a 2018 song by KSI

Sculpture
 Ares Borghese, a Roman marble sculpture
 Ludovisi Ares, a Roman marble sculpture

Television
 Ares (Hercules and Xena), the Greek god as portrayed on the series Hercules: The Legendary Journeys and Xena: Warrior Princess
 "Ares" (Hercules: The Legendary Journeys), an episode of Hercules: The Legendary Journeys
 Ares (TV series), a Dutch Netflix original series
 Ares IV, a spacecraft in the Star Trek: Voyager episode "One Small Step"
 Tekfur Ares, a character in the Turkish TV series Diriliş: Ertuğrul

Video games
 Ares (video game)
 A.R.E.S.: Extinction Agenda, side-scrolling action platform game

People
 Ares (musician), Norwegian extreme metal musician
 Ares (wrestler), professional wrestler
 Ares Schwager, the nickname/stagename of the American musician and guitarist Brian Schwager
 Ares Tavolazzi, Italian bass player and jazz musician
 Donna Ares, the stage name of Bosniak folk singer Azra Kolaković
Malcom Adu Ares, Spanish footballer
 Richard Arès, French Canadian humanist and writer
 Ares or Aris Velouchiotis, nom de guerre of Athanasios Klaras (1905-1945), leader of the Greek resistance during World War II

Places

Earth
 Arès, a town at the north of Arcachon Bay in France
 Arês, Rio Grande do Norte, a municipality in Brazil
 Ares, Spain, a municipality
 Ares Cliff, on the east side of Alexander Island in Antarctica
 Ares del Maestrat, a town in Alt Maestrat, Spain
 Col d'Ares, a Pyrenees mountain pass on the border between France and Spain
 Col des Ares, a mountain pass in Haute-Garonne in southwest France
 Muela de Ares, a mountain in the province of Castellón, Spain
 "Rock of Ares", a rock outcropping site in Greece known as the Areopagus

Mars
 Ares Vallis, an outflow channel in the Oxia Palus quadrangle on Mars
 Aerial Regional-scale Environmental Survey, a proposed Mars aircraft

Other uses
 L'Alliance républicaine, écologique et sociale, a French coalition of parties
 ARES Incorporated, a firearm and weapon system manufacturer
 Ares Management, a global alternative asset manager
 ARES (Aciéries Rodange Esch-Schifflange), a company formed in 1994 from ARBED-Esch Schifflange and Minière et Métallurgique de Rodange
 International Conference on Availability, Reliability and Security
 Ares, plural of are, a unit of area (=100 m2)

See also 

 Ares in popular culture
 
 
 
 AIRES
 Aries (disambiguation)
 Aris (disambiguation)
 Mars (disambiguation)